O. vulgaris may refer to:
 Octopus vulgaris, the common octopus, the most studied of all octopus species
 Opuntia vulgaris, a synonym for Opuntia ficus-indica, the Indian fig opuntia or barbary fig, a cactus species and a long-domesticated crop plant

See also
 Vulgaris (disambiguation)